Justin Blanchard is an American actor who has performed in television, film, theatre and radio. He is a member of SAG-AFTRA and the Actors' Equity Association.

Education
Blanchard grew up in San Antonio, Texas and currently resides in Los Angeles, California. He earned his BFA in Drama from New York University’s Tisch School of the Arts, training at the CAP21 musical theater program, the Experimental Theatre Wing and the Stonestreet Film and Television Studio. He received his MFA in Acting from Brown University, then led by Artistic Director Oskar Eustis. Blanchard has performed professionally for more than 20 years, and is a current member of SAG-AFTRA and the Actors' Equity Association.

Blanchard is an alumnus of Texas Military Institute. He achieved the rank of Lieutenant Colonel as a Company Commander in TMI's nationally-distinguished Corps of Cadets.

Career
Justin Blanchard has performed in television, film, theatre and radio.

Blanchard made his Broadway debut as 2nd Lieutenant Hibbert in the acclaimed production of Journey's End. Journey's End received the Tony Award, Drama Desk Award, Outer Critics Circle Award, Drama League Award and a special citation from the New York Drama Critics Circle all for "Best Revival of a Play.” Journey's End was Blanchard’s first ever audition in New York City.

In television and film, Blanchard has been a Guest Star on Law & Order: Special Victims Unit and co-starred in the PBS special The Mystery of Matter: Marie Curie. Other notable television appearances include All My Children, Guiding Light, and One Life to Live. He is featured in commercials for Oscar De La Renta (w/ Rooney Mara, Dir.: David Fincher) and the MTV: Safe Sex campaign. In film, he has co-starred in The Middleman (Dir: by Heath Cullens), Over There (Dir: Mark Parees), and Alyssa & Sara (Dir: Josh Wick). He has also done voiceover work for audiobooks such as Romeo and Juliet, A Midsummer Night’s Dream, the radio plays of J.M. Barrie, video games and commercials.

Notable theatrical performances include: King of Navarre in Love’s Labour’s Lost for Commonwealth Shakespeare Company in Boston Common, Hamlet in Hamlet and Henry V in Henry V for New York Classical Theatre (Off-Broadway), Malcolm in Macbeth for Theatre For a New Audience (Off-Broadway), Iago in Othello at the Shakespeare Festival of St. Louis, and Iachimo in Fiasco Theater’s Cymbeline. Justin starred opposite Antonio Banderas and Chita Rivera as Niko in the Broadway workshop for Zorba.

References

Justin Blanchard Reel
Broadway World - News Articles
Broadway World - Event Photos
Journey's End:
-Playbill.com 
-New York Times
-Washington Post
-Bloomberg
Hamlet:
-New York Times
-arts World Financial Center.com
Veritas:
-Backstage

-VERITAS Ensemble receives 2010 FringeNYC Overall Excellence Award
Speech & Debate:
Brown/Trinity Playwrights Rep
Top Ten Most Produced Plays of 2009-2010.
Google Books
Podcast of The Will by J.M. Barrie

External links 
 Justin Blanchard's official web site

American male stage actors
American male television actors
American male film actors
Tisch School of the Arts alumni
Living people
Male actors from Dallas
TMI Episcopal alumni
Male actors from San Antonio
Year of birth missing (living people)